Minuscule 733 (in the Gregory-Aland numbering), Θε324 (von Soden), is a Greek minuscule manuscript of the New Testament written on parchment. Palaeographically it has been assigned to the 12th century. The manuscript has no complex contents. Scrivener labelled it as 751e.
It has marginalia.

Description 

The codex contains the text of the four Gospels on 347 parchment leaves (size ), with one lacuna (Mark 1:1-3; 16:15-fin; John 3:6-5:21). The text of Luke 1:1-5 was supplied by a later hand. The text is written in one column per page, 40-47 lines per page.

There is no another division according to the smaller Ammonian Sections, with references to the Eusebian Canons.

It has a commentary, and portrait of Evangelist Matthew.

Text 

Aland did not place the Greek text of the codex in any Category.

It was not examined by using the Claremont Profile Method.

History 

Scrivener and Gregory dated the manuscript to the 12th century. The manuscript is currently dated by the INTF to the 12th century.

The manuscript was added to the list of New Testament manuscripts by Scrivener (751) and Gregory (733). It was examined and described by Paulin Martin. Gregory saw the manuscript in 1885.

The manuscript is now housed at the Bibliothèque nationale de France (Gr. 190) in Paris.

See also 

 List of New Testament minuscules
 Biblical manuscript
 Textual criticism

References

Further reading 

 

Greek New Testament minuscules
12th-century biblical manuscripts
Bibliothèque nationale de France collections